Michael Ron (born 15 August 1932) is a retired Israeli fencer. He competed in the individual sabre event at the 1960 Summer Olympics at the age of 28. He was eliminated in Round One after he won one bout (defeating Mohamed Ben Joullon of Morocco) and lost four.

References

External links
 

1932 births
Living people
Israeli male sabre fencers
Olympic fencers of Israel
Fencers at the 1960 Summer Olympics
20th-century Israeli people